The Parker Tapes is the debut album from UK group Cassetteboy.  The duo claim it took them 7 years to finish.  It contains many short tracks and a long track listing.

Overview 

Highlights include the song "Fly Me To New York", a satirical political swipe at the 9/11 bombing, which includes Frank Sinatra's voice cut up to create the dialog. Joliver is a cut up of various Jamie Oliver samples, proclaiming himself to be a 'tosser', whilst 'Nogged Out with Sharon Davies' transforms David Bowie's 'Space Oddity' to hilarious effect. 'Pasta Rasta's Camo Visor Advisor (Revised)' is a cut up version of the song 'Camouflage' by Stan Ridgeway. 'Old Time Romantic Doves' chops up Lee Dorsey's 'Get Out My Life, Woman', whilst 'Dancing with Manatees' uses elements of Aphex Twin's 'Every Day'. Other sample sources include The Fall, Doctor Who, The Professionals, Madonna, many television advertisements, Coronation Street, The Smiths, BBC News, and St Winifred's School Choir, although cataloguing every sample used on the album is a near-impossible task. In addition to this, the album contains several longer, hip-hop inspired loops as interludes.  The album received a favourable review in the New Musical Express upon release .

Track listing
 "Sabbaba"
 "Pilly the Bigs"
 "Fist Up Mother Brown"
 "Young Friends"
 "Nogged Out with Sharon Davies"
 "Blood and Pus"
 "An Old Hook"
 "Billy Bonds Loop"
 "Joliver"
 "Bokey and the Smandits"
 "Bring Back Cloaks"
 "Old Time Romantic Doves"
 "Dixy Shit"
 "Dancing with Manatees"
 "Job and Bosie"
 "TR 389 SH L82 TR 380"
 "Trout Leg Legg Street"
 "CV Mosq and More Except for CV Mosq"
 "The Crime Busters of the Sea"
 "100 Degree Neck Cracking Pins"
 "Chocolate Sushi"
 "Expensive Shoes Born Cheap Worn Once"
 "My Dad Knows Your Brother"
 "Wind It Up Rob, We'll Dance"
 "New Drun 2"
 "Chicken Cake"
 "Shit & Bird Muck"
 "Well Now"
 "You Always Seemed So Brave Before"
 "What Happened to You Eh?"
 "Herron?"
 "Pigeon Nosebag"
 "Hat Whistle the Shoe Whistle"
 "Baronia Marine"
 "Fred Horse"
 "Cos We're Livin on Adam Clayton"
 "Grunder"
 "Bill Hate Figure"
 "Ah, Tone, the Brownies!"
 "2hrs Later Loop"
 "Magic Watery Stickers"
 "A Black Swan Bit My Red Shoe"
 "Sick as a Dog"
 "Hideous Krow"
 "Thomas Chad"
 "Darkside Farmers"
 "Big Up All Our Mates"
 "Smiggie Balls, Duff Paddy, Shoepack"
 "2 Millennium Big Knee"
 "Pasta Rasta's Camo Visor Advisor (Revised)"
 "Large Father"
 "Gold Small Cat"
 "Krylon"
 "Elint Castwood"
 "A Chance to Turn it Off"
 "Cybear"
 "Got Myself A __ Tied Up in the Basement"
 "My Dad's Brother Knows Russell Crowe"
 "Anyway, Right, So I Said to Her"
 "If That's Yer Attitude"
 "You Can Just About Forget It"
 "Rwuul Mwroededded"
 "Crocodile Tears"
 "Jangly Watt.sits On the Prom"
 "Pissed Up and Shitting"
 "The Legend of the Swedish Galleon"
 "The Meat Section"
 "Gasoff Kettleggs"
 "MF Doom"
 "Pen Cock"
 "Dogs Dogs Dogs Dogs Oh Yeah Dogs"
 "Ferrularbis"
 "Atta Michi Hoi"
 "Foliage Nick Included"
 "Your Love is Fading"
 "Is It Hardcore?"
 "Brian Cardboard and His Swaying Stance"
 "We're Fucking Ragbags As It Is"
 "Barn Master Farley"
 "Scott says the Slum"
 "Bich Ho Tran"
 "The Sea Dogs"
 "The Kickabout"
 "Scrap Heap Services"
 "The One Behind It"
 "In Yer Eye"
 "10 $ Sting"
 "And a Complete Change of Blood"
 "Phil Collins' Cock"
 "Cool Fighter"
 "Drums"
 "6 it"
 "Dirt Slug the Finest" (featuring JT)
 "Fly Me to New York" (featuring DJ Rubbish)
 "alecchristie.com"
 "Your Love is Like Off Benelyn"
 "(Thats Enough Meaningless Track Names-Ed.)"
 "Big Ugly Fat-necked Wombat-headed Big-bellied Magpie-legged Narrow-hipped Splay-footed Sons of Irish Bailiffs"

References

External links
 Cassetteboy on MySpace
 Cassetteboy on youtube

Cassetteboy albums
2002 debut albums